Enghelab Metro Station is a station of Tehran Metro Line 4. It is located in Enghelab Square, the junctions of Azadi Street, Enqelab Street and Kargar Street. It is between Teatr-e Shahr Metro Station and Tohid Metro Station.

References

Tehran Metro stations